Alexandra Hidalgo is a Venezuelan-American documentary film director, editor and theorist. She is best known for her work on the documentaries Teta and Vanishing Borders and for her video book Cámara Retórica: A Feminist Filmmaking Methodology for Rhetoric and Composition.

Early life and education
Alexandra was born in Caracas, Venezuela and immigrated to Dayton, Ohio at the age of sixteen. She holds a BA from the Honors Tutorial College, a MA in creative writing from Naropa University, and a Ph.D. in Rhetoric and Composition from Purdue University.

Career 
Hidalgo is an assistant professor at Michigan State University. She is also the co-founder and editor-in-chief of the online publication agnès films.

Hidalgo's debut documentary feature, Vanishing Borders, screened at the All Lights India International Film Festival and Glendale International Film Festival. It also won a Kudos Endeavor Award for Human Spirit feature at the Docs Without Borders Film Festival. In 2017, her documentary film, Teta, screened at the Athens International Film and Video Festival and Boston Latino International Film Festival. It also won the Best Documentary Film Award at the 10th Jaipur International Film Festival.

Filmography

Books
 2017 - Cámara Retórica: A Feminist Filmmaking Methodology for Rhetoric and Composition (video book)
 2018 - Pixelating the Self: Digital Feminist Memoirs

References

External links
 
 

Living people
American documentary film directors
American documentary film producers
Year of birth missing (living people)